Eugene G. Cheever (December 30, 1928 – January 13, 2011) was an American football player and coach. He served as the head football coach at Dakota Wesleyan University in Mitchell, South Dakota from 1952 to 1953, compiling a record of 8–7.

Head coaching record

College

References

1928 births
2011 deaths
People from Brookings, South Dakota
Players of American football from South Dakota
American football halfbacks
South Dakota State Jackrabbits football players
Coaches of American football from South Dakota
Dakota Wesleyan Tigers football coaches
High school football coaches in South Dakota